Muyudian is a town in Laiyang, Yantai, in eastern Shandong province, China.

References

Township-level divisions of Shandong